is a carbonaceous Baptistina asteroid and potentially slow rotator from the inner regions of the asteroid belt, approximately 6 kilometers in diameter. It was discovered on 18 September 1982, by Belgian astronomer Henri Debehogne at ESO La Silla Observatory in northern Chile.

Orbit and classification 

The C-type asteroid belongs to the small Baptistina family. It orbits the Sun at a distance of 1.8–2.7 AU once every 3 years and 5 months (1,254 days). Its orbit has an eccentricity of 0.20 and an inclination of 5° with respect to the ecliptic. As no precoveries were taken, and no prior identifications were made, the asteroid's observation arc begins with its official discovery observation.

Physical characteristics 

In September 2013, a rotational lightcurve of this asteroid was obtained from photometric observations in the R-band at the Palomar Transient Factory in California. It gave an exceptionally long rotation period of 1917 hours with a brightness amplitude of 0.04 magnitude. However, the fragmentary light-curve has received a low quality rating by the Collaborative Asteroid Lightcurve Link (CALL) which means that the result could be completely wrong (also see potentially slow rotator).

CALL assumes a standard albedo for carbonaceous asteroids of 0.057 and calculates a diameter of 5.71 kilometers, based on an absolute magnitude of 14.49.

Numbering and naming 

This minor planet was numbered by the Minor Planet Center on 28 September 1999. As of 2018, it has not been named.

References

External links 
 Asteroid Lightcurve Database (LCDB), query form (info )
 Dictionary of Minor Planet Names, Google books
 Asteroids and comets rotation curves, CdR – Observatoire de Genève, Raoul Behrend
 Discovery Circumstances: Numbered Minor Planets (10001)-(15000) – Minor Planet Center
 
 

011474
Discoveries by Henri Debehogne
19820918